René Marie (born René Marie Stevens, November 7, 1955 in Warrenton, Virginia, United States) is an American songwriter and jazz vocalist.

Career
She began her professional music career at age 42. Originally she performed as René Croan; she released her first album using this name in 1999.  That year she also performed at Blues Alley in Washington, D.C. and signed a contract with the St. Louis-based Maxjazz label. She released four albums on the label, the second of which (Vertigo) was awarded a coronet ranking by The Penguin Guide to Jazz, a distinction given to less than 85 other recordings in jazz history. In her work, the singer often combines contrasting songs ("Dixie" and the anti-lynching "Strange Fruit" on Vertigo) or combines other works (Ravel's Boléro and Leonard Cohen's "Suzanne" on Live at Jazz Standard.)

René Marie attracted controversy in 2008, when she was invited to sing "The Star-Spangled Banner" at a civic event in Denver, and substituted the song's lyrics with those from "Lift Every Voice and Sing." This arrangement of the national anthem forms part of the titular suite of Marie's 2011 CD, The Voice of My Beautiful Country (Motéma Music). She specialises in writing her own music, and she comments on the fact that this is not the norm in jazz in one of her songs, "This for Joe," after a club manager who got mad at her for singing originals.  Her 2011 release, Black Lace Freudian Slip contains only three songs that she did not write, and one of those was written by her son, Michael A. Croan, who performs on the track with her.

She also released a number of singles in 2007–2009, focused on homeless issues, "This Is Not a Protest Song", and the racial problems in Jena, Louisiana, "3 Nooses Hanging".

Besides her purely musical works, she has also written, produced and performed a one-woman show of words and music, Slut Energy Theory – U'Dean, in which she explores the journey from sexual abuse to self-esteem. More recent productions of the show have shortened the title simply to "Slut Energy Theory." The soundtrack to this show has been released.

Personal life
René Marie married at age 18, and was a mother of two children by age 23. When her husband issued an ultimatum after 23 years of marriage for her to stop singing or leave, she chose music over her turbulent marriage.

Discography
 Renaissance (Flat 5, 1999, as René Croan)
 How Can I Keep from Singing? (Maxjazz, 2000)
 Vertigo (Maxjazz, 2001)
 Live at the Jazz Standard (Maxjazz, 2003)
 Serene Renegade (Maxjazz, 2004)
 Experiment in Truth (2007)
 Black Lace Freudian Slip (Motema, 2011)
 Voice of My Beautiful Country (Motema, 2011)
 I Wanna Be Evil: With Love to Eartha Kitt (Motema, 2013)
 Sound of Red (Motema, 2016)
 Darius de Haas, Rene Marie, Karen Oberlin, Janis Siegel, Ice on the Hudson: Songs by Renee Rosnes and David Hajdu (SMK, 2018)

References

External links
 Official website

1955 births
Living people
American jazz singers
African-American women singer-songwriters
People from Warrenton, Virginia
Singer-songwriters from Virginia
Jazz musicians from Virginia
Motéma Music artists
21st-century African-American women singers
20th-century African-American women singers